Simple Mission is the third album by the Canadian band Glass Tiger, released in 1991.

The single "My Town" features Rod Stewart on lead vocals alongside Alan Frew, and reached No. 33 on the UK, marking the band's second highest position in that country. "Animal Heart" received a Juno Award nomination. The album was certified platinum in Canada.

Production
The album was produced mostly by Tom Werman. Tony Thompson played drums on the majority of its tracks. The band attempted to incorporate rock styles alongside its pop.

Critical reception

The Toronto Star wrote: "By the fourth or fifth listen, one senses the pure, unvarnished Glass Tiger, and that's a band still very much rooted in the ethos of mid-'70s arena-rock, a hybrid of your basic REO Speedwagon, Foreigner, Journey and Kansas." The Windsor Star noted that the album "has a raunchier, gutsier sound on most of the tunes, a conscious effort on their part to emphasize guitar rather than keyboards." The Edmonton Journal concluded that "every cut on this uneven effort is slathered with rackety electric guitar riffs and self-consciously aggressive vocals that ape everyone from Aerosmith's Steve Tyler to Corey Hart."

Track listing

Produced by Tom Werman except:
 track 5, produced by Tom Werman and Jim Cregan
 track 7, produced by Sam Reid
 track 11, produced by Tom Werman and Jim Vallance

Personnel

Glass Tiger
 Al Connelly - guitars
 Wayne Parker - electric bass
Sam Reid - keyboards
 Alan Frew - vocals

Additional musicians
 Drums: Tony Thompson (except tracks 4 and 6)
 Drums: John Keane (tracks 4 and 6)
 Backing vocals: Tom Kelly, Tommy Funderburk, Rique Franks, Jeff Scott Soto, Mark Free, Paul Rafferty
 Spanish voice: Maria Del Rey
 Vocals on "My Town": Rod Stewart
 Acoustic guitar on "My Town": Jim Cregan
 Additional guitars: Tim Pierce
 Additional keyboards on "One to One": Jim Vallance
 Saxophone solo on "Where Did Our Love Go": Gary Herbig
 Extra percussion: Alex Acuña
 String Arrangement on "Where Did Our Love Go": James Newton Howard

Production
 Associate Producer: Sam Reid
 Engineering: Eddie DeLena
 Mixing: Eddie DeLena and David Thoener
 Assistance: Neal Avron, Ed Goodreau, Greg Goldman, and Efren Herrera
 Additional Engineering: Neal Avron
 Recording: Jim Vallance
 Mastering: Stephen Marcussen (Precision Lacquer, Los Angeles)

References

Glass Tiger albums
1991 albums
Capitol Records albums
Albums produced by Tom Werman